Walter Adolphe Roberts (1886-1962) was a Jamaican born novelist, poet, and historian. Roberts served as a war correspondent during World War I, editor of multiple periodicals including Ainslee's Magazine, and authored over a dozen books.

Life and career 

Roberts was born in Kingston, Jamaica on October 15, 1886.

He was an editor, war correspondent, and the author of several books of poetry and prose, as well as a historian of Jamaica and the Caribbean.

In 1938 Roberts met Wilfred Adolphus Domingo and the two formed the Jamaica Progressive League.

During his lifetime Roberts received several awards, including the Silver Musgrave Medal from the Institute of Jamaica (1941), the Carlos Manuel de Cespedes Order of Merit (1950), the Gold Musgrave Medal from the Institute of Jamaica (1954), the title of Officer of the Most Excellent Order of the British Empire (1961), and was posthumously awarded the Commander of the Order of Distinction by the Jamaican Government (1977).

He died in London at the age of 76, on September 13, 1962.

Bibliography 

 Pierrot Wounded and Other Poems, Britton Publishing Company, 1919
 Pan and Peacocks-Poems, Four Seas Company, 1928
 The Haunting Hand, MacCauley Company, 1926
 The Mind Reader, MacCauley Company, 1929
 The Moralist, Mohawk Press, 1931
 The Top Floor Killer, Nicholson and Watson, 1935
 The Pomegranate, Bobbs-Merrill, 1978
 Royal Street: A Novel of Old New Orleans, Bobbs-Merrill, 1944
 Brave Mardi Gras: A New Orleans Novel of the '60s, Bobbs-Merrill, 1946
 Creole Dusk, Bobbs-Merrill, 1948
 The Single Star, Bobbs-Merrill, 1949
 Six Great Jamaicans, Pioneer Press, 1952
 Havana: The Portrait of a City, Bobbs-Merrill, 1953
 Jamaica: The Portrait of an Island, Bobbs-Merrill, 1955
 Caribbean Narrative, Heinemann, 1966,
 New Ships: An Anthology of West Indian Verse, Del Rey, 1978

References 

1886 births
1962 deaths
20th-century male writers
20th-century Jamaican writers